Transitional housing is temporary housing for certain segments of the homeless population, including working homeless people who are earning too little money to afford long-term housing. Transitional housing is set up to transition residents into permanent, affordable housing. It is not in an emergency homeless shelter, but usually a room or apartment in a residence with support services.

Description
The transitional time can be short, for example one or two years, and in that time the person must file for and get permanent housing and usually some gainful employment or income, even if Social Security or assistance. Sometimes, the transitional housing residence program charges a room and board fee, maybe 30% of an individual's income, which is sometimes partially or fully refunded after the person procures a permanent place to live in. In the USA, federal funding for transitional housing programs was originally allocated in the McKinney–Vento Homeless Assistance Act of 1986.

An example of Transitional Housing designed specifically for youth is the Foyer model. Providers generally provide a combination of affordable accommodation with vocational, work, and counseling opportunities.

See also 

 Boarding house – residence that provides meals and a room to live in, with some communal areas
 Rooming house – residence that provides a room to live in, but not meals
 Single room occupancy – residence that rents rooms to individuals

References

Homelessness